Enrique del Valle (born 22 July 1958) is an Ecuadorian judoka. He competed in the men's lightweight event at the 1976 Summer Olympics.

References

1958 births
Living people
Ecuadorian male judoka
Olympic judoka of Ecuador
Judoka at the 1976 Summer Olympics
Place of birth missing (living people)